Shattered was a reality television programme shown on Channel 4 in the United Kingdom. It was aired in 2004.

Ten contestants were challenged with going without sleep for seven days while their actions were constantly monitored. Over the seven days the ten housemates had to endure daily performance testing and a variety of challenges. They were competing for a potential prize fund of £100,000 though, at any point, if a contestant closed their eyes for over ten seconds, then £1,000 was deducted from the prize fund.

Daily tests and challenges

Performance tests
These included a memory test, a clock test, which measured their perception of time, a reaction test and a stroop test, which examined their mental agility.  The people that showed the strongest drop in performance had to face off in a live challenge that evening, the loser being evicted from the house.

You Snooze You Lose
Every day a contestant was chosen by their peers to endure an hour-long "You Snooze You Lose" challenge, in which the chosen contestant was tasked with remaining awake through an experience intended to encourage them to fall asleep.  These challenges were:
 A facial treatment
 Cuddling a giant teddy bear
 Listening to a bedtime story, repeated throughout the hour
 Watching paint dry while seated in a warm chair
 Counting sheep on a television
 Listening to a lecture on triangles that the contestants had attended earlier in the week

Contestants

 Contestant was up for elimination
 Contestant was eliminated
 Contestant voluntarily left the competition
 The winner of Shattered
 The runner up of Shattered
 The 2nd runner up of Shattered

Adverse reaction
Though research has gone into the effects of sleep deprivation nobody knew exactly what to expect.  Hallucinations and odd behaviour were evident quite quickly in some contestants.  Numerous contestants, shortly before falling asleep, experienced heightened hypnagogic states. Other contestants became hostile and irrational the longer they remained awake.

Chris believed himself to be the Prime Minister of Australia and also thought he was on the set for the popular Australian soap Neighbours.
Jimmy became irrationally angry when the others refused to put on their Japanese armour and play with an imaginary ball.
Dean and Jonathan were convinced their clothes had been stolen.
Dean nearly suffered a fall, as he started to succumb to sleep while still standing.
Claire began telling fabricated stories of when she was arm wrestling Irish boxer Joey Rouine.

After 75 hours Lucy walked out, having talked to the psychiatrist and deciding that she could no longer continue.  Chris, Dean, Clare S and Jimmy were the only contestants to fall asleep.

The Sleep Off countdown
At 3.45pm on the final day the contestants were sent to bed — the last to fall asleep won or alternatively they would immediately lose the competition if they spoke, turned away from the camera, covered their faces or closed their eyes for longer than 10 seconds.  The show reported that Jonathan and Chris fell asleep within a quarter of a second of each other at 4.12pm while Clare continued to stay awake until 6.10pm.  At this point she was informed by the camera crew to go to sleep as there was concern she was not coping well with remaining awake due to displaying erratic head movements.  It turned out that she actually really needed the bathroom and was trying to signal to the crew this by flicking her head towards the toilet hoping they would gather this as she was worried that if she spoke she would be removed from the contest.  She endured 178 hours of sleep deprivation.

References

External links
Shattered at Channel4.com
 

Channel 4 original programming
British reality television series
2004 British television series debuts
2004 British television series endings